APIC may refer to:

Organisations
 Africa Policy Information Center, a parent-body of Africa Action
 American Political Items Collectors, a US-based organization of collectors of items from political campaigns
 Asia-Pacific Institute of Creativity, a former college in Miaoli County, Taiwan
 Association for Professionals in Infection Control and Epidemiology, a US-based healthcare-advancement organization

Other uses
 Additional paid in capital, in finance
 Advanced Programmable Interrupt Controller, in computing: a type of programmable interrupt controller
 Application Policy Infrastructure Controller, a component of Cisco's implementation of software-defined networking
 APIC vector (absolute pitch-class interval vector), in musical set theory
 Agreement on the Privileges and Immunities of the International Criminal Court, an international treaty
 Asia Petrochemical Industry Conference, an international conference in the petrochemical industry

See also
 Apic acid, a component of apitoxin, or honey bee venom